Insaniyat is a 1967 Pakistani Urdu language black-and-white film produced by A. Hameed, directed by Shabab Kiranvi who also wrote the screenplay. The film starred Waheed Murad, Zeba, Tariq Aziz, Firdous and Nanna. The film revolves around a doctor, who has to treat the husband of his ex beloved, suffering from cancer.

The film was a remake of the Indian film, Dil Ek Mandir which in turn was the remake of a Tamil film, Nenjil Or Aalayam.

Cast
 Zeba
 Waheed Murad
 Tariq Aziz
 Firdous Begum
 Razia
 Nanha
 Ali Ejaz
 Ali Baba
 Asha Posley
 Tani
 G.N. Butt
 Guests: Sultan Rahi, Salma Mumtaz, Zeenat, Hameed Wyne

Release 
Insaniyat was released on 24 February 1967 by Shabab Productions in Pakistani cinemas. It was a silver jubilee film, completing 30 weeks in theaters.

In 2017, it was screened by Lok Virsa Museum.

Plot 
Insaniyat is a story of a dedicated doctor Ajmal and a faithful love interest Noor Jahan. Ajmal leaves the country for abroad to get a higher degree in medical sciences whereas his beloved Noor Jahan waits for his return. Before his return, Noor Jahan is forcefully married to Jahangir by her parents. On wedding night, it is discovered that Jahangir is a cancer patient. After returning home, Ajmal saves his patient Jahangir's life who was married to his beloved. Firdous played the role of a mad girl, Perveen under medical treatment in Ajmal's clinic.

Music
The music of Insaniyat is composed by M Ashraf and the lyrics are written by the director Shabab Kiranvi, Khawaja Pervez and Nazim Panipati. Playback singers are Ahmed Rushdi, Mala and Irene Parveen.

Jan-e-bahar, jan-e-tamanna... by Ahmed Rushdi
Pyar mein sub kuch chalta hai... by Ahmed Rushdi & Irene Parveen
Mohabbat mein sara jahan jal gaya hai by Mala 
Mere hamdam mere sathi... by Mala 
Ummat ke ghamkhwar... Naat song by Mala
Hai ri mohabbat... by Mala
Dil na lagana... by Irene Parveen

References

External links
 

1960s Urdu-language films
Pakistani remakes of Indian films
1967 films
Pakistani black-and-white films
Urdu-language Pakistani films
Films scored by M Ashraf

Pakistani buddy films